Peter Keeley, who uses the pseudonym Kevin Fulton, is a British agent from Newry, Northern Ireland, who allegedly spied on the Provisional Irish Republican Army (IRA) for MI5. He is believed to be in London, where he is suing the Crown, claiming his military handlers cut off their connections and financial aid to him. In 2004, he reportedly sued the Andersonstown News, an Irish republican news outlet in Belfast, for revealing his identity as well as publishing his photograph. The result of that suit has not been made public.

Background
Fulton's real name is purportedly Peter Keeley, a Catholic from Newry, who joined the Royal Irish Rangers at the age of 18. He was selected and trained by the Intelligence Corps and returned to civilian life to infiltrate the IRA. He reportedly gave evidence to the Smithwick Tribunal, in which he reasserted his claim that Garda Owen Corrigan was a double agent for the IRA.

Undercover activity
In Unsung Hero, Fulton claims he worked undercover as a British Army agent within the IRA. He was believed to have operated predominantly inside the IRA's South Down Brigade, as well as concentrating on the heavy IRA activity in South Armagh. Fulton and four members of his IRA unit in Newry reportedly pioneered the use of flash guns to detonate bombs.

In one incident, Fulton was questioned on responsibility for designing firing mechanisms used in a horizontal mortar attack on a Royal Ulster Constabulary (RUC) armoured patrol car on Merchants Quay, Newry, County Down, on 27 March 1992. Colleen McMurray, a constable (aged 34) died and another constable was seriously injured. Fulton claims he tipped off his MI5 handler that an attack was likely.

Arrest
On 5 November 2006, he was released without charge after being arrested in London, and transferred to Belfast to be questioned about his knowledge or involvement in the deaths of Irish People's Liberation Organisation member Eoin Morley (aged 23), Royal Ulster Constabulary officer Colleen McMurray (34), and Ranger Cyril Smith (aged 21). "I personally did not kill people", he stated. His lawyers asked the British Ministry of Defence to provide him and his family with new identities, relocation and immediate implementation of the complete financial package, including his army pension and other discharge benefits, which he had been reportedly promised by the MoD for his covert tour of duty. His ex-wife, Margaret Keeley, filed a lawsuit in early 2014 for full access to documents relating to her ex-husband. She claims to have been wrongfully arrested and falsely imprisoned during a three-day period in 1994 following a purported attempt by the IRA to assassinate a senior detective in East Belfast.

Legal cases
On 26 November 2013, it was reported that The Irish News had won a legal battle after a judge ruled against Keeley's lawsuit against the newspaper for breach of privacy and copyright, by publishing his photograph, which thereby also, he argued, endangered his life. Belfast District Judge Isobel Brownlie stated at least twice that she was not impressed with Keeley's evidence and described him as "disingenuous". Under British law, Keeley will also be billed for the newspaper's legal costs.

On 31 January 2014, the Belfast High Court ruled that Fulton had to pay damages to Eilish Morley, the mother of IPLO member Eoin Morley, shot dead at age 23 by the IRA. The order was issued based upon his failure to appear in court. The scale of the pay-out for which he is liable was to be assessed at a later stage but was never published.

References

External links
 "Ex-IRA mole is released by police", BBC News, 5 November 2006.
 "Former spy released without charge", RTÉ News, 6 November 2006.
 "Kevin Fulton" profile, lesenfantsterribles.org; accessed 4 May 2014.
November 2021
 "Former British spy sued over alleged roll in IRA shooting", The Belfast Newsletter; 13 November 2021.
November 2021
 "Peter Keeley", KRW Law;  Jun 21, 2014.
November 2022
"Former British agent Peter Keeley working for far-right leader Tommy Robinson, book claims", Irish News;  14 November, 2022.

March 2022
 "Former British spy inside the IRA facing up to 25 lawsuits in connection with paramilitary murders and attacks", Irish News;  11 March, 2022..

 "Far-right activist Tommy Robinson ‘using former IRA mole to spy on opponents’", The Guardian;  13 November, 2022.

1960s births
British spies
Living people
Military personnel from Newry
Provisional Irish Republican Army members
Irish spies during The Troubles (Northern Ireland)
Royal Irish Rangers soldiers